Barry Brooks (born 1983) is an Australian rules footballer.

Barry Brooks may also refer to:

 Barry Macey Brooks (born 1975), American football player
 Barry Brooks (diplomat), High Commissioner from New Zealand to India

See also
Barry Brook (disambiguation)